The Secretary of the Navy of the Republic of Texas was a member of the Cabinet of the President of the Republic of Texas responsible for naval affairs and management of the Texas Navy.  The office lasted from 1836 until 1841, when it was merged with Secretary of War under the title Secretary of War and Marine by President Sam Houston during his second term.

References

1836 establishments in the Republic of Texas
1841 disestablishments in North America
Republic of Texas
Texas Revolution
Texas Navy
Ministries established in 1836